Leslie Esdaile Banks ( Peterson; December 11, 1959 – August 2, 2011) was an American writer under the pen names of Leslie Esdaile, Leslie E. Banks, Leslie Banks, Leslie Esdaile Banks and L. A. Banks. She wrote in various genres, including African-American literature, romance, women's fiction, crime suspense, dark fantasy/horror and non-fiction.

She won several literary awards, including the 2008 Essence Literary Awards Storyteller of the Year.

Biography
Leslie Ann Peterson was born and raised in Philadelphia, Pennsylvania. She married Michael Esdaile,; they had one child, a daughter, Helena Esdaile. The couple divorced and she remarried, to Al Banks, in 2000.

Banks contributed to magazines and newspaper columns, and wrote commercial fiction for five major publishers:  St. Martin's Press (NYC), Simon & Schuster (NYC), Kensington Publishing (NYC), BET/Arabesque (NYC), and Genesis Press (MS). Books 1 and 2 of The Vampire Huntress Legend Series (Minion and The Awakening, respectively), have been optioned for Hollywood films by GothamBeach Entertainment and Griot Entertainment. Originally a nine-book series, The Vampire Huntress Legend Series has been expanded to twelve (the last being called "The Thirteenth").

Illness and death
In June 2011, it was announced on Banks' website that she had been diagnosed with late-stage adrenal cancer. It was revealed that due to the extreme costs of her medical care, her family opened up a charitable fund in her name in one of the local Pennsylvania banks. The literary community also rallied around the ailing author, with several supporters starting a series of auctions where the proceeds went towards Banks' medical care. Authors including P. N. Elrod, Heather Graham and Charlaine Harris donated books and services to raise funds for Banks, as did others in the literary community.

Banks' official website was updated to reflect her death from cancer on August 2, 2011, at the age of 51. She is survived by her daughter, Helena Esdaile.

Bibliography

As Leslie Esdaile

Romance novels
 Sundance (1996)
 Slow Burn (1997)
 Love Notes (2001)
 Love Lessons (2001)
 River of Souls (2001)
 Love Potions (2002)
 Still Waters Run Deep (2002)
 Tomorrow's Promise (2002)
 Through the Storm (2002)
 Sister Got Game (2004)
 Keepin' It Real (2005)
 Take Me There (2006)
 Better Than (June 2008)

Romance novellas
 "Home For The Holidays" in Midnight Clear (et al.) (2000) (*)
 "Time Enough for Love" in After the Vows (et al.) (2001) (*)
 "Valentine's Love" in Candlelight and You (et al.) (2003) (*)
 "Shameless" in Sisterhood of Shopaholics (et al.) (2003) (*)
  "A 'No Drama' Valentine's" in Valentin's Day is Killing Me (et al.) (2006) (*)

Alexis Grant
Men of the Delta Force Series
 Sizzle & Burn
 Locked at Loaded

Non-fiction
 How To Write A Romance For The New Market (1999) (*)

As Leslie E. Banks

Drama, TV adaptation novels
 Soul Food: For Better, For Worse (October 1, 2002)
 Soul Food: Through Thick and Thin (March 1, 2003)
 Soul Food: No Mountain High Enough (September 30, 2003)

As Leslie Banks

Non-fiction
 "Light at the End of the Tunnel" in Chicken Soup for the African American Soul (2004) (*)

As Leslie Esdaile Banks

Crime and suspense
 Betrayal of the Trust (2004)
 Blind Trust (2005)
 Shattered Trust (2006)
 No Trust (final book) (September 2007)

As L. A. Banks

Crime and suspense
 Scarface, The Beginning, Volume 1  (2006)
 Scarface, Point of No Return, Volume 2 (TBD)

Paranormal

The Vampire Huntress Legend Series
 Minion (trade paperback) (2003) (mass market) (2004)
 The Awakening (trade paperback) (2004) (mass market) (2004)
 The Hunted (trade paperback) (2004) (mass market) (2005)
 The Bitten (trade paperback) (2005) (mass market) (2005)
 The Forbidden (trade paperback) (2005) (mass market) (2006)
 The Damned (trade paperback) (2006) (mass market) (2007)
 The Forsaken (trade paperback) (2006) (mass market) (2007)
 The Wicked (trade paperback) (2007) (mass market) (2008)
 The Cursed  (trade paperback) (2007) (mass market) (2008)
 The Darkness (trade paperback) (2008) (mass market) (2008)
 The Shadows (trade paperback) (2008) (Book 11) (2009)
 The Thirteenth (trade paperback) (2009)

NOTE: The Darkness (10), The Shadows (11), and The Thirteenth (12) are called The Armageddon Finale to The Vampire Huntress (trademark) Legend Series.

Neteru Academy
 Shadow Walker: A Neteru Academy Novel (trade paper back) (2010) (mass market) (2010)

Crimson Moon novels
 Bad Blood (2008)
 Bite The Bullet (2008)
 Undead on Arrival (2009)
 Cursed to Death (2009)
 Never Cry Werewolf (2010)
 Left for Undead (2010)

Dark Avengers Series
 Finders Keepers (2008)
 Loser's Weepers (2008)

The Dark Series

 Surrender the Dark (2011)
 Conquer the Dark (2011)

Paranormal novellas

Articles
 Fiction Factor – Building Characters Through Realism
 Authors Supporting Authors Positively

References

External links
 
 The Vampire Huntress Legend Series Website
 Crimson Moon Novels Website
 Official Leslie Banks MySpace
 neteruacademy.com

Interviews
Romance in Color
The Sister Circle Book Club
WritersNewsWeekly.com Literary Spotlight

Reviews
Paranormal romance Reviews
The Best Reviews

1959 births
2011 deaths
20th-century American novelists
21st-century American novelists
African-American non-fiction writers
African-American novelists
American crime fiction writers
American romantic fiction writers
American women novelists
Deaths from cancer in Pennsylvania
Deaths from adrenocortical cancer
Philadelphia High School for Girls alumni
Urban fantasy writers
Writers from Philadelphia
Women science fiction and fantasy writers
Women romantic fiction writers
20th-century American women writers
21st-century American women writers
Black speculative fiction authors
Women crime fiction writers
Novelists from Pennsylvania
American women non-fiction writers
20th-century American non-fiction writers
21st-century American non-fiction writers
20th-century African-American women writers
20th-century African-American writers
21st-century African-American women writers
21st-century African-American writers